"Thunderbirds / 3AM" (titled "Thunderbirds Are Go" on some editions of the single and album) is a double A-side single by English pop punk band Busted. It was released on 26 July 2004 as the fourth single from their second studio album, A Present for Everyone (2003). "Thunderbirds" was not originally included on the album, having been written specifically for the 2004 film Thunderbirds, although it later appeared on a re-issue of the album in Europe. "Thunderbirds" was not released on an album in the United Kingdom until the release of the group's live album A Ticket for Everyone: Busted Live in 2005.

"Thunderbirds / 3AM" was Busted's last single to enter the UK Singles Chart until the release of "On What You're On" in 2016, reaching number one. It was the 19th best-selling single of 2004 in the UK and also won the title of 2004 Record of the Year, and received an 8/10 rating from Stylus Magazine. "3AM" was later performed by Matt Willis during his 2007 solo tour, and by James Bourne on his 2012 acoustic solo tour.

Track listings

UK CD1
 "3AM" (live from tour)
 "Thunderbirds"

UK CD2
 "3AM" (radio edit)
 "Thunderbirds"
 "Runaway Train" (Soul Asylum cover)
 "3AM" (acoustic version)
 "Thunderbirds" (acoustic version)
 "Busted in Japan" (Part 1)

UK DVD single
 "3AM"
 "Thunderbirds"
 "Crashed the Wedding" (live audio mix from tour)
 "Crashed the Wedding" (live footage from tour)
 "Thunderbirds" (video)
 "Busted in Japan" (Part 2)

Personnel

"Thunderbirds"
Personnel are taken from the A Ticket for Everyone: Busted Live album booklet.

 James Bourne – writing
 Matt Willis – writing
 Charlie Simpson – writing
 Tom Fletcher – writing
 Gray – writing
 Steve Power – production
 Bob Clearmountain – mixing (at Mix This, Pacific Palisades, California)
 Jim Brumby – Pro Tools engineering
 Kevin Harp – assistant engineering

"3AM"
Personnel are taken from the A Present for Everyone album booklet.

 The Matrix – production, arrangement, recording
 Lauren Christy – writing
 Scott Spock – writing
 Graham Edwards – writing
 Charlie Simpson – writing
 James Bourne – writing
 Andrew Nast – production, arrangement, and recording assistant
 Steve Power – mixing
 Tim Young – mastering

Charts
All entries charted as "Thunderbirds" except where noted.

Weekly charts

Year-end charts

Certifications

References

2004 singles
Busted (band) songs
Film theme songs
Island Records singles
Music based on science fiction works
Music based on television series
Number-one singles in Scotland
Song recordings produced by the Matrix (production team)
Song recordings produced by Steve Power
Songs about aviators
Songs about fictional male characters
Songs written by Charlie Simpson
Songs written by Graham Edwards (musician)
Songs written by James Bourne
Songs written by Lauren Christy
Songs written by Matt Willis
Songs written by Scott Spock
Songs written by Tom Fletcher
Songs written for films
UK Singles Chart number-one singles
Universal Records singles
Works based on Thunderbirds (TV series)